August Jensen (born 29 August 1991) is a Norwegian cyclist, who currently rides for UCI ProTeam .

Major results

2012
 1st  Road race, National Under-23 Road Championships
 1st Stage 2 Tour of Jämtland
2014
 1st  Mountains classification Kreiz Breizh Elites
 1st  Mountains classification Arctic Race of Norway
2015
 1st  Overall Circuit des Plages Vendéennes
1st Stages 2 & 4
 1st  Overall Kreiz Breizh Elites
1st Stage 4
 1st  Mountains classification Arctic Race of Norway
 5th Skive–Løbet
 5th Ringerike GP
 6th Hadeland GP
2016
 1st  Overall GP Liberty Seguros
1st Stage 1
 4th GP Viborg
 6th Overall East Bohemia Tour
 9th Ringerike GP
 10th Overall Tour of Norway
2017
 Oberösterreich Rundfahrt
1st  Points classification
1st Stages 3 & 4
 2nd Overall Arctic Race of Norway
1st Stage 3
 4th Overall Tour de Normandie
 4th Overall Tour des Fjords
 4th Ringerike GP
 4th Grote Prijs Jef Scherens
 4th Kampioenschap van Vlaanderen
 5th Overall Tour of Norway
 6th Overall Kreiz Breizh Elites
1st  Points classification
 9th Grand Prix de la Ville de Lillers
 9th Heistse Pijl
 10th Overall Tour du Loir-et-Cher
1st Stage 5
2018
 5th Elfstedenronde
 8th Halle–Ingooigem
 10th Primus Classic
2019
 8th Veenendaal–Veenendaal Classic
 8th Omloop Mandel-Leie-Schelde
2020
 8th Paris–Tours
 10th Overall Tour of Saudi Arabia
2021
 10th Paris–Bourges

References

External links

1991 births
Living people
Norwegian male cyclists
Sportspeople from Bodø
European Games competitors for Norway
Cyclists at the 2019 European Games